The Arts Council of Wales (ACW) is a Welsh Government-sponsored body, responsible for funding and developing the arts in Wales.

Established within the Arts Council of Great Britain in 1946, as the Welsh Arts Council, its English name was changed to the Arts Council of Wales when it was independently established  by royal charter on 30 March 1994 (the Welsh name remained the same), upon its merger with the three Welsh regional arts associations. It became accountable to the National Assembly for Wales on 1 July 1999, when responsibility was transferred from the Secretary of State for Wales. The Welsh Government provides ACW with money to fund the arts in Wales. ACW also distributes National Lottery funding for the arts in Wales, allocated by the Department for Digital, Culture, Media and Sport (DCMS).

The Arts Council of Wales is a registered charity under English law and has a board of trustees who meet six times a year, chaired by Phil George. Apart from the Chair, Council members are not paid; they are appointed by the Welsh Government. The Arts Council of Wales has offices in Colwyn Bay, Carmarthen and Cardiff. Nick Capaldi was its chief executive from 2008 until September 2021.

The Arts Council partners with the National Eisteddfod of Wales to produce its annual "Y Lle Celf" exhibition of Welsh art, craft and design.

References

External links
 Arts Council of Wales official website

Welsh Government sponsored bodies
Arts councils of the United Kingdom
Arts Council of
Welsh art
1946 establishments in Wales
Arts organizations established in 1946
Charities based in Wales